Dzhena Valentinova Nedelcheva-Stoeva (born Desislava Valentinova Nedelcheva, ; born 3 July 1985), better known simply as Dzhena is a Bulgarian pop-folk and folk singer.

Biography 
Desislava Valentinova Nedelcheva was born in Razgrad on 3 July 1985. She has elder sister Borislava. In 2006 she signed a one-year contract with Azis's company Leo Music. Initially, Nedelcheva began performing under moniker "Nova Desislava", but in 2007 finally began performing as Dzhena. At the beginning of 2007, her colleague Milko Kalaydzhiev encouraged her to sign a contract with the company Payner and the contract took place on 16 March 2007. In the same year she released first album Greshni misli (Sinful Thoughts). In the same year she took part in one of the most prestigious festivals in Bulgaria, Pirin Folk, where she won first prize for performing arts with the song "Pesen za Dame Voyvoda" (Song for Voivode Dame) written and composed by herself. In 2011, Dzhena went on US tour. She held concerts for the Bulgarian diaspora. Dzhena received special Fashion Idol Award in 2015. In 2018, she released a folk album in collaboration with Kanarite Orchestra.

Personal life 
In December 2015, she got engaged to Atanas Stoev Jr., marrying him on her birthday, 3 July 2016.

In March 2017, Dzhena gave birth to a baby boy, Atanas Stoev III.

Awards 
Planeta TV Awards
2007: Debut of the year
2008: Ambassador of Bulgarian music abroad
2014: The Song of the Year Моли се да не почна
2016: Original presence of club scene
2016: Ambassador of Bulgarian music abroad

Discography

Albums 
Studio albums
2008 — Грешни мисли (Sinful thoughts)
2010 — Не знаеш коя съм (You don't know who I am)
2012 — Да видя какво е (To see what it is)
2014 — Моли се да не почна (Pray wasn't started)
2017 — Срещна ни хорото (with Kanarite Orchestra, We met the dance)
2017 — Да ти бъда корона (Let me be your crown)
Compilations
2009 Jenna The best selection
2013 Златните хитове на Джена (Golden hits of Zhena)

Videos / Songs 
From album Грешни мисли
2007: Грешни мисли
2007: Химия
2008: Слепи бяхме (with Ilian)
2008: Луд и съвършен
From album Не знаеш коя съм
2008: Омръзна ми (remix - with DJ Zhivko Mix)
2008: Ще те спечеля
2009: Кой си ти
2009: Случайна среща
2009: Чуждите и лесните
2010: Не ставаш
From album Да видя какво е
2010: С повече от две
2010: Стойки не чупи
2010: Всичко давам да си тук
2011: Да се влюбя, не допускам
2011: Да те прежаля (with Andreas)
2011: Да те бях ранила
2012: Обичам те и толкова
2012: Да видя какво е
From album Моли се да не почна
2013: Истината
2013: Кой ме събра с тебе
2013: Как не се уморих
2013: Пий едно от мене (with Andrea)
2014: Моли се да не почна
2014: Неверници
2014: Да ти се доказвам
2014: Моята награда
From album Да ти бъда корона
2015: Спри да ми досаждаш
2015: Градът работи за мен
2015: Ти къде беше
2016: Всичко знаеш
2016: Дразни ме пак
2016: Зависима
2017: Коя
2017: Тук жена пази му (with Preslava)
2017: Да ти бъда корона
Various
2006: Не ме е грижа
2010: Къде е пичът
2018: Диагноза - Ти
2018: Хулиган
2018: Не слагай от отровата (with Andreas)
2018: Яко ми е
2019: Горкото момиче
2019: Вижте го, жени
2019: Достойната
2020: Шот за болката

References

Payner artists
21st-century Bulgarian women singers
Bulgarian folk-pop singers
1985 births
Living people
Bulgarian folk singers
Contraltos
People from Razgrad